Boli may refer to:

Boli (TV series), a Bangladeshi streaming television series
Boli (food), a golden yellow sweet pancake made with flour and ghee in South India
Boli (plantain), the name for roasted plantain in Nigeria
Boli, a fetish of Mali
Boli (ice pop), a Mexican type of ice pop frozen in a plastic bag
Boli (steroid)
Boli County (勃利县), Heilongjiang, China
Boli, Heilongjiang (勃利镇), town in and seat of Boli County
Boli, Jiangsu (博里镇), town in Chuzhou District, Huai'an, Jiangsu, China
Boli Rural District, in Iran
Boli, Côte d'Ivoire, town and commune
Bolu, Turkey (Boli having been one historical spelling)
Khabarovsk, formerly known from its Chinese name as Boli (伯力), major city of the Russian Far East
Boliyan, a style of music popular in Punjab
Bank-owned life insurance
Oregon Bureau of Labor and Industries
Basile Boli, a French football player, born in 1967
Yannick Boli, a Thai football player